Charles Perry Scott (7 June 1847, in Hull – 13 February 1927, in Shanghai) was an Anglican missionary bishop.

Scott was born into an ecclesiastical family: his father was the Rev. John Scott, sometime Vicar of St Mary, Hull. He was named for his godfather, Charles Perry (Bishop of Melbourne) and educated at Charterhouse and Jesus College, Cambridge, where he graduated B.A. in 1870. Ordained in 1871, he was a Curate at  St Peter, Eaton Square before going to China as a missionary. In 1880 he was appointed bishop in North China, a post he held until 1913. His diocese included five Chinese provinces. In 1889 he married Frances Emily Burrows, daughter of the Oxford historian Montagu Burrows. He died on 13 February 1927.

References

1898 births
People educated at Charterhouse School
Alumni of Jesus College, Cambridge
Anglican missionary bishops in China
1927 deaths
20th-century Anglican bishops in China
Anglican bishops of North China